Brandon Archer (born October 30, 1983) is a former American football linebacker. He was signed by the Indianapolis Colts as an undrafted free agent and played for the Colts in the 2007 season. Archer also played in the Italian Football League. He played college football at Kansas State.

Archer was also a practice squad member of the Minnesota Vikings, Denver Broncos, and Washington Redskins. 

In 2009, Archer signed and played in the Italian Football League for Rhinos Milano.

References

External links
Denver Broncos bio
Indianapolis Colts bio
Kansas State Wildcats bio
Washington Redskins bio

1983 births
Living people
American football linebackers
Kansas State Wildcats football players
Indianapolis Colts players
Minnesota Vikings players
Denver Broncos players
Washington Redskins players
American expatriate sportspeople in Italy
American expatriate players of American football
Players of American football from Minneapolis
Players of American football from Minnesota
Players of American football from Saint Paul, Minnesota